nib Group (nib, formerly Newcastle Industrial Benefits) is an Australian health care fund. It was established in the NSW Hunter Region in 1952 to provide health insurance for workers at the BHP Steelworks, and has since grown into a national and international operation. As of 2017, nib held an 8.3% share of the Australian private health cover market.

History 
nib was established in the NSW Hunter Region in 1952 to provide health insurance for workers at the BHP Steelworks.

In 1995, nib was involved in a landmark court case after they rejected family health cover to a homosexual couple. While most health insurers at the time were choosing to recognise same-sex relationships, there had been no official ruling on the matter. The subsequent court case, Hope & Brown vs NIB, found that nib had violated the Anti-Discrimination Act 1977, setting a legal precedent that redefined 'family' to include same-sex couples and their children for the purposes of health insurance. nib appealed the ruling, but their application was dismissed by the Supreme Court of New South Wales.

Privatisation
In 2007, eligible policyholders and company members voted in favour of demutualisation of the health fund.  The Federal Court of Australia approved  the demutualisation on 5 November 2007. Later that day, nib became the first private health insurance fund to list on the Australian Securities Exchange (ASX).

Diversification and expansion

In 2010, nib set about expanding globally, purchasing IMAN International Pty Ltd, a specialist provider of health cover for temporary migrant workers in Australia for approximately $25 million. In 2012, they acquired the New Zealand health insurer, TOWER Medical Insurance, from  Tower Insurance, for approximately NZ$102 million (A$80 million). As of 2012, nib New Zealand was the country's second largest health insurer, providing health and medical insurance to around 160,000 New Zealanders.

In 2013, nib launched Whitecoat Health Service Directory, a free online search and comparison service. The site has been likened to being the TripAdvisor of the healthcare sector. While popular with consumers, the service has received significant criticism from doctors and medical groups.

In 2014, nib entered a distribution alliance with Suncorp subsidiary Apia to sell private health insurance under the Apia brand. Later that year, nib partnered with global medical insurer AXA PPP International in launching a global health cover pilot product in New Zealand.

In 2016, nib announced the acquisition of World Nomads Group, Australia's third-largest distributor of travel insurance, for $95 million. In 2019, nib rebranded World Nomads Group to nib Travel. The following year they acquired GU Health, Australia's only established specialist corporate group health insurer, for $155.5 million.

In 2019, nib acquired QBE’s travel insurance business, QBE Travel, as part of its World Nomads Group expansion. nib also announced a partnership with Tasly, a Chinese pharmaceutical company.

nib foundation

nib established the charity group nib foundation in 2008, following a $25 million donation raised through the issue of new shares at the time of listing nib on the Australian Securities Exchange in November 2007. Since inception, over $19 million in grant funding has been provided to aid the development and delivery of health and wellbeing initiatives. The foundation has partnered with 140 Australian charities at a local and national level.

Sponsorship and ambassadors

nib sponsors a number of major sporting organisations in Australia and New Zealand, including the Newcastle Knights, the New South Wales rugby league team, the Auckland Blues, the Richmond Tigers Men's and Women's leagues and the Newcastle Jets W-League.

Former rugby league footballer, Paul Harragon, has been the face of nib in Australia since 1991.

References

External links 
Official website

Health insurance in Australia
Newcastle, New South Wales
Financial services companies established in 1952
Insurance companies of Australia
Companies listed on the Australian Securities Exchange
Australian companies established in 1952